Reward is an unincorporated community in western Kern County, California.

Geography
Reward is located in the McKittrick Oil Field.

History
Reward was the location of the Aguaje de Santa Maria (Waterhole of Saint Mary) water stop on the 19th century El Camino Viejo in Alta California.

The first wooden oil derrick in Kern County was constructed at the future site of Reward in 1878, to drill for flux oil to mix with asphalt that was being mined in Asphalto and refined in McKittrick.  The settlement of Reward was founded in 1907, its name derived from the discovery of oil at the site. A post office operating there from 1909 to 1937.

References

Unincorporated communities in Kern County, California
El Camino Viejo
Temblor Range
Populated places established in 1907
1907 establishments in California
Unincorporated communities in California